The 2022–23 Villanova Wildcats women's basketball team represented Villanova University in the 2022–23 NCAA Division I women's basketball season. The Wildcats, led by 3rd-year head coach Denise Dillon, play their home games at the Finneran Pavilion and are members of the Big East Conference.

Previous season 

The Wildcats finished the season at 24–9 and 15–4 in Big East play to finish in second place. They advanced to the championship game of the Big East women's tournament where they lost to UConn. They received an at-large bid to the NCAA Women's Tournament as a 11th seed in Wichita region where they defeated BYU in the first round before losing to Michigan in the second round.

Offseason

Departures
Due to COVID-19 disruptions throughout NCAA sports in 2020–21, the NCAA announced that the 2020–21 season would not count against the athletic eligibility of any individual involved in an NCAA winter sport, including women's basketball. This meant that all seniors in 2020–21 had the option to return for 2021–22.

Incoming transfers

Recruiting
There were no recruiting classing class of 2022.

Roster

Schedule

|-
!colspan=9 style=| Regular season

|-
!colspan=9 style=| Big East Women's Tournament

|-
!colspan=9 style=| NCAA tournament

Rankings

*The preseason and week 1 polls were the same.^Coaches did not release a week 2 poll.

See also
 2022–23 Villanova Wildcats men's basketball team

References

Villanova Wildcats women's basketball seasons
Villanova
Villanova
Villanova
Villanova